The 2020 National People's Congress was the Third Plenary Session of the 13th National People's Congress. It was held from Friday 22 to 28 May, concurrently with the Chinese People's Political Consultative Conference (CPPCC) as part of the annual Two Sessions. It was originally scheduled to be held in March 2020 at the Great Hall of the People in Beijing, China, however due to the global COVID-19 pandemic, it had been delayed until May.

Due to the ongoing health crisis, it was shorter than the usual weeklong affair. The thousands of deputies in attendance were all tested for the coronavirus and isolated ahead of the event, and most events involving reporters took place through online conferencing.

Premier Li Keqiang did not announce a growth target for the Chinese economy for the year when he delivered the Standing Committee's work report to the NPC delegates on Friday morning.

The NPC announced an increase of 6.6 per cent in its military spending.

The Congress voted on an anti-sedition law in response to the 2019–20 Hong Kong protests, thereby bypassing the Legislative Council of Hong Kong. The law banned sedition, secession and subversion of the government in Beijing. In response, United States Department of State spokeswoman Morgan Ortagus warned that "any effort to impose national security legislation that does not reflect the will of the people of Hong Kong" would be met with international condemnation. The US State Department' comments were countered by China, who decried any attempt by the US to interfere with internal Chinese affairs.

References

National People's Congress, 2020
National People's Congress, 2020
National People's Congresses
COVID-19 pandemic in mainland China
National People's Congress, 2020
National People's Congress, 2020